Storms House may refer to:

 Storms House in Wickenburg, Arizona, listed on the National Register of Historic Places in Maricopa County, Arizona
 Storms House in Franklin Lakes, New Jersey, listed on the National Register of Historic Places in Bergen County, New Jersey